Serra is Latin for "saw" (a view from a high place, or a saw, see serrated), Italian for "greenhouse", and Sardinian, Galician, Portuguese and Catalan for "mountain range" or "saw".

Serra can be used as a given name or as a surname. As a surname, it may refer to:

A 
Achille Serra (disambiguation), multiple people
Adriana Serra (1923–1995), Italian film actress
Adriana Serra Zanetti (born 1976), Italian tennis player
Agustín José Bernaus y Serra (1863–1930), Roman-catholic bishop
Al Garcia-Serra, Cuban-American businessman
Albert Serra (born 1975), Spanish independent filmmaker
Albert Serra (born 1978), Spanish footballer
Alberto Serra (1870–1912), Spanish football pioneer and sports journalist
Alfons Serra (born 1990), Spanish footballer
Angel Serra (born 1951), Cuban rower
Anna Serra (born 1968), Catalan long-distance runner
Antonella Serra Zanetti (born 1980), Italian tennis player
Antoni Arabí i Serra (born 1953), Spanish football player
Antoni Serra Serra (1708–1755), Catholic religious writer
Antonio Serra (born 1963), Italian comics writer
Antonio Serra, Italian philosopher and economist
Antonius Serra (1610–1669), Roman Catholic prelate

B 
Barbara Serra (born 1974), British journalist
Brampoque Serra Silva Sá (born 1996) known as Brash, Guinea-Bissauan footballer

C 
Carlo Zendo Tetsugen Serra (born 1953), Italian missionary Soto Zen master
Chico Serra (born 1957), Brazilian racing driver
Clara Serra (born 1982), Spanish politician and feminist author
Corinne Serra Tosio (born 1965), French sports shooter
Cristoforo Serra (1600–1689), Italian painter

D 
Daniel Serra (born 1984), Brazilian auto racing driver
Diana Serra Cary (1918–2020), known as Baby Peggy Montgomery, American child actress
Domenico Serra (1899–1965), Italian actor

E 
Eduardo Serra (born 1943), Portuguese  cinematographer
Eduardo Serra (born 1958), Italian naval officer
Eduardo Serra Rexach (born 1946), Spanish politician and businessman
Enric Serra Auqué (1858–1918), Catalan painter
Éric Serra (born 1959), French composer
Ernesto Serra (1860–1915), Italian painter
Eudalt Serra, Spanish composer

F 
Federico Serra (born 1997), Italian football player
Federico Serra Miras (born 1979), Argentine rugby union player
Fiorenzo Serra (1921–2005), Italian film director
Florent Serra (born 1981), French tennis player

G 
Gabriela Serra (born 1951), Spanish teacher and politician
Gennaro Serra, Duke of Cassano (1772–1779), Italian revolutionary and soldier
Giacomo Serra (1570–1623), Catholic cardinal
Gianni Serra (1933–2020), Italian film director and screenwriter

H 

 Hidalgo Serra (born 1985), Spanish-Italian musical artist

I 
Isabel Serra (born 1989), Spanish activist and politician

J 
Jaime Serra (died after 1405), Catalan painter
Jaime Serra (1921–2022), Portuguese politician
Jaime Serra Palou (born 1964), Catalan artist and journalist
Jaime Serra Puche (born 1951), Mexican economist
Janni Serra (born 1998), German footballer
Jaume Serra i Cau (died 1517), Spanish Valencian cardinal
Jaume Serra Serra (born 1959), Andorran politician
Jaume Collet-Serra (born 1974), Spanish-American film director
Jean Serra (born 1940), French mathematician and engineer
Joan Serra (1927–2015), Spanish water polo player
Joaquim Serra (1838–1888), Brazilian journalist, professor, politician and playwright
Joaquín Collar Serra (1906–1933), Spanish military aviator
José Correia da Serra (1750–1823), Portuguese polymath
José Serra Gil (1923–2002), Spanish cyclist
José Serra (born 1942), Brazilian politician
Joseph Serra (born 1940), American politician
Juan de Serras, Jamaican Maroon chief
St. Junípero Serra (1713–1784), Spanish missionary

K 

 Katia Serra (born 1973), Italian footballer
 Koldo Serra (born 1975), Spanish film director and screenwriter

L 
Loïc Serra (born 1972), French Formula One engineer
Lorenzo Serra Ferrer (born 1953), Spanish football manager
Luciana Serra (born 1946), Italian soprano
Luigi Serra (1846–1888), Italian painter
Luis Serra (1935–1992), Uruguayan cyclist
Louis-Ferdinand de Rocca Serra (1936–2021), French politician

M 
Manuel Serra Moret (1884–1963), Catalan politician and writer
Manuel Francisco Serra (1935–1994), Portuguese footballer who played as a defender for Benfica.
María Martha Serra Lima (1944–2017), Argentine singer
Mario José Serra (1926–2005), prelate of the Catholic Church
Màrius Serra (born 1963), Spanish writer
Marivi Fernández-Serra, Spanish condensed matter physicist
Matt Serra (born 1974), American martial artist
Maurizio Serra (born 1955), Italian writer and diplomat
Michele Serra (born 1954), Italian writer, journalist and satirist
Miguel de los Santos Serra y Sucarrats (1868–1936), Spanish prelate of the Roman Catholic church and Bishop of Sergorbe

N 
Narcís Serra (born 1943), Spanish politician
Narciso Serra (1830–1877), Spanish poet and dramatist
Noelia Serra (born 1977),  Dominican-Spanish tennis player

O 
Osvaldo de Jesus Serra Van-Dúnem (1950–2006), Angolan politician
Otto Mayer-Serra (1904–1968), Spanish-Mexican musicologist

P 
Pedro Serra (1899–1983), Spanish footballer
Pedro Antón Serra (1585–1632), Roman Catholic prelate
Pedro António Joaquim Correia da Serra Garção (1724–1772), Portuguese poet
Pere Serra (fl. 1357–1406), Catalan painter

R 
Rafael Serra (1858–1909), Afro-Cuban intellectual, journalist and activist 
Raimundo Irineu Serra, (1892–1971), founder of Santo Daime, an Amazonian mystery school
Ramón Daumal Serra (1912–2008), Spanish Bishop of the Roman Catholic Church 
Raymond Serra (1936–2003), American actor 
Richard Serra (born 1938), American sculptor
Robert Serra (1987–2014), Venezuelan politician
Roberta Serra (born 1970),  Italian alpine skier
Roberto Serra (born 1982), Italian short track speed skater
Roser Serra (born 1971), Spanish international football goalkeeper

S 
Sila Calderon Serra (born 1942), first female governor of Puerto Rico

T 
Tomás Pérez Serra (born 1998), Argentine football player
Tomas Serra Olives (born 1944), Spanish chess master
Tony Serra (born 1934), American activist

X 
Xavier Serra (born 1959), Spanish researcher

Fictional characters
Inara Serra, character from the science-fiction television series Firefly

See also
Serra (disambiguation)
Sierra (disambiguation)
Sardinian surnames

References 

Italian-language surnames
Catalan-language surnames
Portuguese-language surnames